León (Jujuy) is a rural municipality and village in Jujuy Province in Argentina.

References

Populated places in Jujuy Province
Cities in Argentina
Argentina
Jujuy Province